The Charging Chasseur, or An Officer of the Imperial Horse Guards Charging is an oil painting on canvas of about 1812 by the French painter Théodore Géricault,  portraying a mounted Napoleonic cavalry officer who is ready to attack.

The painting was Géricault's first exhibited work and it is an example of Géricault's attempt to condense both movement and structure in its art. It represents French romanticism and has a motif similar to Jacques-Louis David's Napoleon Crossing the Alps, but non-classical characteristics of the picture include its dramatic diagonal arrangement and vigorous paint handling.

In The Charging Chasseur, the horse appears to be rearing away from an unseen attacker. The turning figure on a rearing horse is derived from the large early Rubens Saint George (Museo del Prado, 1605–07), though there the view is from the side.

Géricault would continue to move away from classicism, as exemplified in his later masterpiece The Raft of the Medusa (1818–19).

Black American artist Kehinde Wiley reimagined The Charging Chasseur in his 2007 painting Officer of the Hussars. In Officer of the Hussars, a young Black man dressed in a sleeveless shirt, jeans, and Timberland boots sits atop the horse.

References

Sources
 Chu, Petra ten-Doesschate. Nineteenth Century European Art. Prentice Hall: Upper Saddle River, NJ: 2006.

1812 paintings
Paintings in the Louvre by French artists
Paintings by Théodore Géricault
War paintings
Horses in art